The Arguenon is a French coastal river in the Côtes-d'Armor department of the Brittany region. It flows into the English Channel.

Geography 

The river rises in the commune of Le Gouray in Côtes-d'Armor and flows into the sea near Saint-Jacut-de-la-Mer, in the commune of Créhen, in the Bay of Arguenon.
The Arguenon is very wide between Jugon-les-Lacs and Plorec-sur-Arguenon. 

The Arguenon runs northeast from its source to Jugon-les-Lacs, north between Jugon-les-Lacs and Plorec-sur-Arguenon, northeast again between Plorec-sur-Arguenon and Plancoët and north-northeast from Plancoët to its mouth.

During high tides a small tidal bore rises up the river, up to the height of the Guildo bridge.

Communes and cantons crossed 

The Arguenon's course is entirely within the Côtes-d'Armor department.
It crosses twelve communes, from upstream to downstream: Le Gouray (source), Plénée-Jugon, Dolo, Jugon-les-Lacs, Plorec-sur-Arguenon, Plédéliac, Pléven, Bourseul, Pluduno, Plancoët, Saint-Lormel, Créhen and Saint-Cast-le-Guildo (mouth).

Managing body 

The managing body is SAGE Arguenon – Baie de la Fresnaye.

Tributaries 

The Arguenon has four named tributary streams, one river and 10 unnamed tributaries including:
 Rosette river, enlarged by the Rieule, .
 Bos Robert stream, in the two municipalities of Langourla and Plénée-Jugon.
 Quiloury stream, in the four municipalities of Le Gouray, Penguily, Plénée-Jugon and Saint-Glen.
 Étang du Guillier stream, over the four municipalities of Jugon-les-Lacs, Plédéliac, Plestan and Tramain.
 Montafilan stream, in the six municipalities of Corseul, Créhen, Plancoët, Plélan-le-Petit, Saint-Maudez and Saint-Michel-de-Plélan.

We can also add, according to the National Institute of Geographic and Forest Information or Géoportail, and since the Guébriand is not a river in its own right:
 The Guébriand, passing through the commune of Landébia and joining the Arguenon between the communes of Saint-Lormel and Saint-Cast-le-Guildo at the entrance to Arguenon bay opposite the town of Créhen.

Hydrology

Arguenon at Jugon-les-Lacs 

Low water 

Floods 

The Arguenon has experienced several significant floods. 
The first took place in 1974. 
The water overflowed  on the Plancoët quay, causing major and widespread damage. 
The floodwater affected a lot of businesses. 
Shops were closed permanently and a park was completely flooded.

Depth of runoff and specific flow 

The depth of runoff in this part of the river's catchment area is  annually, which is a little lower than the average in France. 

Facilities and ecology

The Arguenon is crossed by Route nationale 176 and Route nationale 12.

The Arguenon estuary is protected by a  Zone naturelle d'intérêt écologique, faunistique et floristique.

Arguenon Bay is part of the Natura 2000 zone Lancieux Bay, Arguenon Bay, Saint Malo and Dinard Archipelago.

Notes

Citations

Sources

Rivers of Côtes-d'Armor
Rivers of Brittany
Rivers of France